The 1989 Boston Marathon was the 93rd running of the annual marathon race in Boston, United States, which was held on April 17. The elite men's race was won by Ethiopia's Abebe Mekonnen in a time of 2:09:06 hours and the women's race was won by Norway's Ingrid Kristiansen in 2:24:33. In the wheelchair race, Philippe Couprie of France won the men's race in 1:36:04 and Connie Hansen of Denmark won the women's race in 1:50:06.

A total of 5104 runners finished the race, 4239 men and 865 women.

Results

Men

Women

Wheelchair men

Wheelchair women

References

Results. Association of Road Racing Statisticians. Retrieved 2020-07-12.
Boston Marathon Historical Results. Boston Athletic Association. Retrieved 2020-07-12.
1989 Boston Marathon Marathon Wheelchair. Athlinks. Retrieved 2020-07-12.

External links
 Boston Athletic Association website

1989
Boston
Boston Marathon
Marathon
Boston Marathon